The Billboard Latin Pop Airplay is a subchart of the Latin Airplay chart that ranked the most-played songs on Latin pop radio stations in the United States. With the issue dated August 15, 2020, Billboard revamped the chart to reflect overall airplay of Latin pop music on Latin radio stations. Instead of ranking songs being played on Latin-pop stations, rankings are instead determined by the amount of airplay Latin-pop songs receive on stations that play Latin music regardless of genre.  Published by Billboard magazine, the data are compiled by Nielsen SoundScan based collectively on each single's weekly airplay.

Chart history

References

United States Latin Pop
2020
2020 in Latin music